Plinthograptis iitae is a species of moth of the family Tortricidae. It is found in Nigeria.

The wingspan is about 14 mm. The ground colour of the forewings is lead grey with an orange yellow costa and paler terminal area. The costal spots are brown and the terminal spots paler. The markings are red, consisting of four spots in the basal area and a median, as well as three posterior marks. The hindwings are pale brownish.

Etymology
The species name refers to Iita, the type locality.

References

Moths described in 2013
Tortricini
Moths of Africa
Taxa named by Józef Razowski